Andrei Gennadevich Ogorodnikov (born 29 August 1982) is a Kazakhstani former ice hockey forward. His career, which lasted from 1999 to 2020, was mainly spent in the Kazakhstan Vyschaya Liga. Internationally he played for the Kazakhstan national team at the 2006 Winter Olympics and at four World Championships.

Career statistics

Regular season and playoffs

International

References

External links
 

1982 births
Living people
Asian Games medalists in ice hockey
Asian Games silver medalists for Kazakhstan
Ice hockey players at the 2003 Asian Winter Games
Ice hockey players at the 2007 Asian Winter Games
Medalists at the 2003 Asian Winter Games
Medalists at the 2007 Asian Winter Games
Olympic ice hockey players of Kazakhstan
Sportspeople from Oskemen